Minuscule 305 (in the Gregory-Aland numbering), Zε30 (Soden), is a Greek minuscule manuscript of the New Testament, on cotton paper. Paleographically it has been assigned to the 13th century. 
It has marginalia.

Description 

The codex contains the text of the four Gospels on 261 cotton paper leaves with one lacuna (John 21:6-25). The text is written in one column per page, in 51-54 lines per page.

There is also a division according to the Ammonian Sections, but added by a later hand.

Lectionary markings at the margin, and incipits were added by a later hand. The biblical text is surrounded by a catena of the authorship of Euthymius Zigabenus.

The text of John 21:6-25 was added by a later hand.

Text 

The Greek text of the codex is a representative of the Byzantine text-type. Aland placed it in Category V.

It was not examined by the Claremont Profile Method.

History 

The manuscript once belonged to Cardinal Mazarin (along with minuscule 14, 311, 313, and 324).

It was added to the list of New Testament manuscripts by Scholz (1794-1852). 
The manuscript was examined by Wettstein, Scholz, and Martin. C. R. Gregory saw the manuscript in 1885.

The manuscript is currently housed at the Bibliothèque nationale de France (Gr. 195) at Paris.

See also 

 List of New Testament minuscules
 Biblical manuscript
 Textual criticism

References

Further reading 

 

Greek New Testament minuscules
13th-century biblical manuscripts
Bibliothèque nationale de France collections